In the mathematical theory of knots, a pretzel link is a special kind of link. It consists of a finite number of tangles made of two intertwined circular helices. The tangles are connected cyclicly, and the first component of the first tangle is connected to the second component of the second tangle, the first component of the second tangle is connected to the second component of the third tangle, and so on. Finally, the first component of the last tangle is connected to the second component of the first. A pretzel link which is also a knot (that is, a link with one component) is a pretzel knot.

Each tangle is characterized by its number of twists: positive if they are counter-clockwise or left-handed, negative if clockwise or right-handed. In the standard projection of the  pretzel link, there are left-handed crossings in the first tangle, in the second, and, in general, in the nth.

A pretzel link can also be described as a Montesinos link with integer tangles.

Some basic results

The  pretzel link is the mirror image of the  pretzel link.

The  pretzel link is isotopic to the  pretzel link. Thus, too, the  pretzel link is isotopic to the  pretzel link.

The  pretzel link is isotopic to the  pretzel link. However, if one orients the links in a canonical way, then these two links have opposite orientations.

Some examples
The (1, 1, 1) pretzel knot is the (right-handed) trefoil; the (−1, −1, −1) pretzel knot is its mirror image.

The (5, −1, −1) pretzel knot is the stevedore knot (61).

If p, q, r are distinct odd integers greater than 1, then the (p, q, r) pretzel knot is a non-invertible knot.

The (2p, 2q, 2r) pretzel link is a link formed by three linked unknots.

The (−3, 0, −3) pretzel knot (square knot (mathematics)) is the connected sum of two trefoil knots.

The (0, q, 0) pretzel link is the split union of an unknot and another knot.

Montesinos

A Montesinos link is a special kind of link that generalizes pretzel links (a pretzel link can also be described as a Montesinos link with integer tangles). A Montesinos link which is also a knot (i.e., a link with one component) is a Montesinos knot.

A Montesinos link is composed of several rational tangles.

The Montesinos link given by this notation consists of the sum of the rational tangles given by the integer  and the rational tangles  

These knots and links are named after the Spanish topologist José María Montesinos Amilibia, who first introduced them in 1973.

Utility
(−2, 3, 2n + 1) pretzel links are especially useful in the study of 3-manifolds.  Many results have been stated about the manifolds that result from Dehn surgery on the (−2,3,7) pretzel knot in particular.

The hyperbolic volume of the complement of the  pretzel link is  times Catalan's constant, approximately 3.66. This pretzel link complement is one of two two-cusped hyperbolic manifolds with the minimum possible volume, the other being the complement of the Whitehead link.

References

Further reading
 Trotter, Hale F.: Non-invertible knots exist, Topology, 2 (1963), 272–280.
 

 
3-manifolds